Remco Torenbosch (born 1982, in Netherlands) is a visual artist.

Biography  
Remco Torenbosch took part in exhibitions and public events at: Kunsthalle Wien, Stedelijk Museum Amsterdam, Kunsthaus Zurich, Centre d'art contemporain du parc Saint-Léger, L'Usine Genève, De Vleeshal Middelburg, GAMeC Bergamo, de Appel Amsterdam and Victoria and Albert Museum,.

Torenbosch was short-listed for the Prix de Rome 2013

References

External links 
 Remco Torenbosch

Living people
1982 births
Berlin University of the Arts alumni
Dutch contemporary artists